Geraldi Issaick (born 27 April 1956) is a Tanzanian boxer. He competed in the men's bantamweight event at the 1980 Summer Olympics.

References

1956 births
Living people
Tanzanian male boxers
Olympic boxers of Tanzania
Boxers at the 1980 Summer Olympics
Place of birth missing (living people)
Bantamweight boxers